Aandahl is a surname. Notable people with the surname include:

Søren Jørgensen Aandahl (1802–1886), Norwegian politician
Fred G. Aandahl (1897–1966), American politician

See also
Aadahl

Norwegian-language surnames